Jimmy 'Z' Zavala (born July 12, 1955) is an American musician. He is notable for playing harmonica on the Eurythmics song "Missionary Man" and performing with the band live. He also played live as part of Rod Stewart's band and appears on "Weird Al" Yankovic's albums "Weird Al" Yankovic in 3-D, Dare to Be Stupid and UHF – Original Motion Picture Soundtrack and Other Stuff. As a studio musician, he also played with Etta James, Tom Petty, Ziggy Marley and Bon Jovi. On his album Muzical Madness, he collaborated with Dr. Dre and ventured into hip-hop.

Discography
Anytime... Anyplace! (1988)
Muzical Madness (1991)
Caught Inside (2003)
Corazón Y Alma de un Jaguar (The Heart and Soul of a Jaguar) (2004)
That's The Way I Roll (2014)

Collaborations 
 Tonight I'm Yours - Rod Stewart (1981)
 Body Wishes - Rod Stewart (1983)
 Inside the Fire - Rita Coolidge (1984)
 Camouflage - Rod Stewart (1984)
 Revenge - Eurythmics (1986)
 Live - Eurythmics (1987)
 More Love (Feargal Sharkey song) - Feargal Sharkey (1987)
 Big Generator - Yes (1987)
 Live 1983–1989 - Eurythmics
 City Streets - Carole King (1989)
 Ghetto Cowboy - Mo Thugs Family (1998)
 Life, Love & the Blues - Etta James (1998)
 Heart of a Woman - Etta James (1999)
 Matriarch of the Blues - Etta James (2000)
 Let's Roll - Etta James (2003)
 Postcards from Paradise - Ringo Starr (2015)
 West of Flushing South of Frisco - Supersonic Blues Machine (2016)
 Both Sides of the Track - Dennis Jones (2016)
 Tell the Truth - Lance Lopez (2018)

References

External links
 Official Site
 Confessions of a Glorified Sideman (blog)
 Facebook Fan Page
 Interview from 2020

1955 births
Living people
Musicians from Sacramento, California
American flautists
American harmonica players
American male saxophonists
Ruthless Records artists
21st-century American saxophonists
21st-century American male musicians
21st-century flautists